Mehmed Said Pasha (‎; 1838–1914), also known as Küçük Said Pasha ("Said Pasha the Younger") or Şapur Çelebi or in his youth as Mabeyn Başkatibi Said Bey, was an Ottoman monarchist, senator, statesman and editor of the Turkish newspaper Jerid-i-Havadis. He was among the statesmen who were disliked by the CUP, the political party which came to power after the Ottoman coup d'état of 1913.

Biography 

According to his contemporary Petre Kharischirashvili, he was of Georgian descent. He became first secretary to Sultan Abdul Hamid II shortly after the Sultan's accession, and is said to have contributed to the realizations of his majesty's design of concentrating power in his own hands; later he became successively minister of the interior and then governor of Bursa, reaching the high post of grand vizier in 1879.  He was grand vizier seven more times under Abdul Hamid II, and once under his successor, Mehmed V. He was known for his opposition to the extension of foreign influence in Turkey.

In 1896, he took refuge at the British embassy in Constantinople, and, though then assured of his personal liberty and safety, remained practically a prisoner in his own house. He came into temporary prominence again during the revolution of 1908. On 22 July he succeeded Mehmed Ferid Pasha as grand vizier, but on the 6 August was replaced by the more liberal Kâmil Pasha, at the insistence of the Young Turks. Also during 1908, Mehmed Said Pasha bought the famed Istanbul arcade in the Beyoğlu district, today known as Çiçek Pasajı ("Flower Passage"). The modern name became common in the 1940s; during Mehmed Said Pasha's ownership in the 1900s and 1910s, the arcade was known as Sait Paşa Pasajı ("Said Pasha Passage").

During the Italian crisis in 1911–12, he was again called to the premiership. He was again removed from power by the Savior Officers (who backed the Freedom and Accord Party (Liberal Union) against the Committee of Union and Progress) and replaced by a new cabinet supported by the Officers and the Freedom and Accord Party. The CUP would return to power, however, the next year after the Ottoman coup d'état of 1913.

Said Pasha became head of the council of state and then as the head of the Ottoman Senate. Just before the start of World War I, he developed bronchitis and died on 1 March 1914 in Istanbul. He was buried at the entrance of Eyüp Sultan Mosque.

References

External links
Bibliography of Küçük Mehmed Said Pasha 
 

Pashas
1838 births
1914 deaths
19th-century Grand Viziers of the Ottoman Empire
20th-century Grand Viziers of the Ottoman Empire
Ottoman people of the Italo-Turkish War
Members of the Senate of the Ottoman Empire
Burials at Eyüp Cemetery
Mabeyn-i hümayun katipleri
Georgians from the Ottoman Empire